Sindre Bjørnestad Skar (born 22 January 1992) is a Norwegian cross-country skier.

At the 2011 Junior World Championships he won two gold medals, one in relay and one in 10 km. He then took one silver and three bronze medals at the 2012 Junior World Championships. He made his FIS Cross-Country World Cup debut in February 2011 in Drammen, where he also collected his first World Cup points with a 28th place finish. He later took his first top-10 placement with a tenth place in Lahti in March 2013.

He represents the sports club Bærums Verk IF.

Cross-country skiing results
All results are sourced from the International Ski Federation (FIS).

World Championships

World Cup

Season standings

Individual podiums
2 victories – (2 ) 
12 podiums – (8 , 4 )

Team podiums
 2 victories – (2 ) 
 4 podiums – (4 )

References

1992 births
Living people
Sportspeople from Bærum
Norwegian male cross-country skiers